This article concerns the period 529 BC – 520 BC.

Events
 529 BC—The Chinese state of Zhoulai is conquered by Wu.
 528 BC—Gautama Buddha attains Enlightenment, and begins his ministry.
527 BC - Jain Tirthankara Mahavira attains Moksha, according to the Swetambara Tradition. 
 527 BC—Peisistratos a tyrant of Athens dies: his son Hippias inherits his power.
 526 BC—Psammetichus III succeeds Amasis II as king of Egypt.
 526 BC—King Liao of Wu ascends to power in the State of Wu in China during the Zhou Dynasty.
 525 BC—Cambyses II, ruler of Persia, conquers Egypt, defeating Psammetichus III. This is considered the end of the Twenty-sixth Dynasty, and the start of the Persian Twenty-seventh Dynasty.
 c. 525 BC—Coins start to have an image on two sides.
 522 BC—Bardiya succeeds Cambyses II as ruler of Persia.
 522 BC—Babylon rebels against Persian rule.
 522 BC—Darius I succeeds Bardiya as ruler of Persia. He is the son of a government official.
 521 BC—The Babylonian rebellion against Persian rule is suppressed.
 520 BC—Dao becomes King of the Zhou dynasty of China but dies before the end of the year.
 520 BC—Cleomenes I succeeds Anaxandridas as king of Sparta (approximate date).
 c. 520 BC—Darius I decrees that work on Jerusalem resume as per the decree of Cyrus the Great.
 c. 520 BC—Kore, from Chios(?), is made. It is now at Acropolis Museum, Athens.
 c. 520 BC—Sarcophagus, from Cerveteri is made. It is now at National Etruscan Museum, Rome (approximate date).
 520 BC–510 BC—The Priam Painter makes "Women at a Fountain House", black-figure decoration on a hydria. It is now at Museum of Fine Arts, Boston.

Births
 521 BC—Leonidas I. King of Sparta
 525 BC—Aeschylus, author of Greek tragedies (d. 456 BC)
 522 BC—Pindar, Greek poet
 520 BC—Panini, Hindu Indian grammarian (d. 460 BC)

Deaths
July, 529 BC—Cyrus the Great, ruler of ancient Persia
528 BC—Anaximenes of Miletus, Greek philosopher (b. 585 BC)
527 BC—Peisistratos, Athenian tyrant
525 BC—Psammetichus III, the last Pharaoh of the Twenty-sixth Dynasty of Egypt
522 BC—Cambyses II, ruler of ancient Persia
522 BC — Polycrates, tyrant of Samos 
September, 522 BC—Bardiya, ruler of ancient Persia